Ten ships of the Royal Navy have borne the name HMS York after the city of York, the county seat of Yorkshire, on the River Ouse.

, 52-gun  launched 1654 as Marston Moor; renamed York upon the Restoration 1660; ran aground and wrecked 1703
, 60-gun fourth rate launched 1706; sunk 1751 at Sheerness as a breakwater
, 60-gun fourth rate launched 1753; broken up 1772
, 12-gun sloop-of-war Betsy captured from the Americans; purchased into the Royal Navy March 1777; captured by the French, 1778; recovered by the British; recaptured by the French, July 1779; renamed Duc DYork; armed with eighteen, 4-pounder guns; broken up 1783
HMS York (1779), was the former East Indiaman Pigot, which the Royal Navy purchased in 1779 for use as storeship in the West Indies; sold in 1781 to local buyers in India.
, 64-gun third rate, intended to be the East Indiaman Royal Admiral; purchased on the stocks 1796 and converted; wrecked 1804
, 74-gun third rate launched 1807; converted to a convict ship 1819; broken up 1854
, a former merchant ship used as an armed boarding steamer in the First World War
,  launched 1928; damaged by Italian motor launches and scuttled in Crete May 1941; scrapped 1952
, Type 42 destroyer launched 1982; Decommissioned in 2012

Battle Honours
Lowestoft 1665
Orfordness 1666
Sole Bay 1672
Schooneveld 1673
Texel 1673
Louisbourg 1758
Martinique 1809
Atlantic 1939
Norway 1940
Mediterranean 1940-41
Malta Convoys 1941

See also

, Canadian Forces Naval Reserve division in Toronto, Ontario
, several ships of this name

Citations

References
Demerliac, Alain (1996) La Marine De Louis XVI: Nomenclature Des Navires Français De 1774 À 1792. (Nice: Éditions OMEGA). 



Royal Navy ship names